This list of mills in Saddleworth, lists textile factories that have existed in Saddleworth, Greater Manchester, England.

Saddleworth is a civil parish of the Metropolitan Borough of Oldham in Greater Manchester, England. It comprises several villages and hamlets amongst the west side of the Pennine hills: Uppermill, Greenfield, Dobcross, Delph, Diggle and others.  Saddleworth lies to the east of the large town of Oldham.

Historically a part of the West Riding of Yorkshire, for centuries Saddleworth was a centre of woollen cloth production in the domestic system. For centuries Saddleworth was linked, ecclesiastically, with the parish of Rochdale though a civil parish in the West Riding of Yorkshire, so was long talked of as the part of Yorkshire where Lancastrians lived. Even then it had an Oldham postal address. Following the Industrial Revolution, Saddleworth became a centre for cotton spinning and weaving.

The former Saddleworth Urban District was the only part of the West Riding to have been amalgamated into Greater Manchester in 1974.

References

Bibliography

Saddleworth
Saddleworth
Saddleworth
Buildings and structures in the Metropolitan Borough of Oldham
Saddleworth
History of the textile industry
Industrial Revolution in England